Burvall is a surname. Notable people with the surname include:

 Amy Burvall, American educator known for History for Music Lovers
 Anders Burvall (born 1964), Swedish sports shooter
 Ken Burvall (born 1966), Swedish footballer

See also
 Burvill